Malaya Rechka is a rural locality (a settlement) in Rasskazikhinsky Selsoviet, Pervomaysky District, Altai Krai, Russia. The population was 23 as of 2013. There is 1 street.

Geography 
Malaya Rechka is located 57 km south of Novoaltaysk (the district's administrative centre) by road. Nizhnyaya Petrovka is the nearest rural locality.

References 

Rural localities in Pervomaysky District, Altai Krai